Amusement rides, sometimes called carnival rides, are mechanical devices or structures that move people to create fun and enjoyment.

Rides are often perceived by many as being scary or more dangerous than they actually are. This could be due to the design, having acrophobia, or from hearing about accidents involving rides that are similar. For some, the adrenaline associated with riding amusement rides is part of the experience.

They are expected at most annual events such as fairs, traveling carnivals, and circuses around the world. Sometimes music festivals and concerts also host amusement park rides.

Types of rides 

 Flat rides are usually considered to be those that move their passengers in a plane generally parallel to the ground, such as rides that spin around a vertical axis, like carousels and twists, and ground level rides such as bumper cars.
 Gravity rides are those where gravity is responsible for all or some of the movement, and where any vertical movement is not about a fixed point, such as roller coasters, water slides, and drop towers.
 Vertical rides usually move their passengers in a vertical plane and around a fixed point, such as Ferris wheels, Enterprise, and Skydiver.
 As of the 2010s, some rides employ virtual reality as a part of the ride experience for greater thrill and fun.

Specific themes 

 Dark ride
 Bumper cars
 Haunted house
 Funhouse
 Pendulum ride
 Rollercoaster
 Ferris wheel

List of amusement rides

Literature 

 Florian Dering: Volksbelustigungen. Eine bildreiche Kulturgeschichte von den Fahr-, Belustigungs- und Geschicklichkeitsgeschäften der Schausteller vom achtzehnten Jahrhundert bis zur Gegenwart. Greno, Nördlingen 1986, .
 Karl Ruisinger: Kirmes Special. Karussells 1950er und 1960er Jahre (= Kirmes Special 1). Gemi Verlag, Reichertshausen 2005, .
 Sacha-Roger Szabo: Rausch und Rummel. Attraktionen auf Jahrmärkten und in Vergnügungsparks. Eine soziologische Kulturgeschichte. transcript-Verlag, Bielefeld 2006,  (Zugleich: Freiburg, Univ., Diss., 2006).

References

External links

 http://www.ride-index.de − Datenbank der Reisenden Fahrgeschäfte in Deutschland (in German)
History of Fairs - Fairground Rides - Modern Rides :: National Fairground Archive
U.S. patents for roller coasters and related rides

Entertainment lists